John Willmott School is a coeducational secondary school and sixth form located in Sutton Coldfield, West Midlands, England.

There are 1,186 students on roll, of whom 230 are in the sixth form. Students from a White British background represent 82% of the school population. Although the school is located in the Falcon Lodge area of Sutton Coldfield, it also serves pupils from elsewhere in Birmingham such as Erdington and Castle Vale. In 2006 the proportions of students receiving free school meals and students who have special educational needs were reported as being above the national average.

History
John Willmott Grammar School was founded in the name of Alderman John Willmott. It was opened in 1958 as a co-educational grammar school in an award-winning building. The school's last year of selective intake, based on the 12+ test, was 1974. It became a comprehensive and changed its name to John Willmott School in 1975.

The school was awarded specialist status as a Technology College in September 2001.

Previously a community school administered by Birmingham City Council, in July 2019 John Willmott School converted to academy status. The school is now sponsored by the Arthur Terry Learning Partnership.

Curriculum
Sixth Form vocational courses have run since 1991, and currently include Art and Design, Business Studies, Childcare, Leisure and Tourism, and Sport and Leisure. In September 2006, the school introduced a range of vocational courses at GCSE level which are in addition to those already available in the sixth form. These vocational courses are intended to complement the traditional GCSE courses already available. The school has been awarded Lead Department status for Business Studies for the city of Birmingham.

Statistics
When Ofsted inspected the school in March 2006, it graded achievement and standards as Grade 3 ("Satisfactory"). The Sixth Form was graded as "Good". Since then, the overall results have improved at a rate faster than the national average, with 2009 results reaching a new high, and the best results in the school's history. The school received its highest GCSE achievement grades, with 70% of pupils getting 5 or more A*-C GCSE grades. The overall A Level pass rate shot up from 90% to 97% - the best A level results since the school was a grammar school.

When Ofsted inspected the school in February 2016, the school was found to be Inadequate.

Sixth Form
The school has an independent Sixth Form which is part of the Sutton Coldfield Consortium. This involves offering subjects unavailable elsewhere and allowing students to study certain subjects at other schools. The Sixth Form, run by Ms. Richards, offers both academic and vocational courses, and provides opportunities for extra-curricular activities and trips.

Sport
Football has been the main sport at John Willmott School for the later part of its history, overtaking rugby. Rugby started off as its predominant sport when John Willmott was a grammar school. It has become gradually less popular, but rugby is being re-introduced at the school and an effort is being made to create a new team to represent the school.

Other sports are offered, such as softball, tennis, badminton, trampolining, table tennis, volleyball, athletics, dancing and basketball.

Notable former pupils

 Paul Agnew - international leading tenor  
 Tony Capaldi -  plays for Northern Premier League Premier Division side Rushall Olympic as a defender
 Amy Jones - English cricketer
 Andrew Moffat - teacher, author and creator of No Outsiders education programme
 Darius Vassell - retired English footballer 
 Emma Willis - English television presenter and former model
 Stacey Cadman - English actress
 Ray Smedley - Represented GB in the Munich Olympics in the 1500 metres
 Demi Rose - Model and social media personality

References

External links

Secondary schools in Birmingham, West Midlands
Sutton Coldfield
Academies in Birmingham, West Midlands